Arthur Joffé (born 20 September 1953) is a French film director, the son of the director and screenwriter Alex Joffé. He was awarded the Palme d'Or du court métrage at the 1982 Cannes film festival for his short film Merlin ou le cours de l'or. He was also the recipient of the Youth Prize in Cannes for his film Casting.

Arthur Joffé was born on 20 September 1953 in Paris. His first full-length feature film was Harem, starring Ben Kingsley and Nastassja Kinski.

Filmography 
 1980 : La Découverte (short feature)
 1982 : Merlin ou le cours de l'or (short feature)
 1982 : Casting
 1985 : Harem
 1990 : Alberto Express
 1998 : Let There Be Light
 2004 : Ne quittez pas !
 2015 : Le Feu sacré (documentary)

References

External links 
 

French film directors
1953 births
Living people